A. C. De Yoe was an American veteran of the Spanish–American War and member of the California State Assembly alongside Governor C. C. Young.

References

American military personnel of the Spanish–American War
members of the California State Assembly